Mette Frost is a former Danish international cricketer who represented the Danish women's team in 23 One Day International matches between 1990 and 1999.

She usually batted in the upper order, and occasionally bowled leg-spin or kept wicket. She made her highest score of 50, which was also the highest score in the match, when she opened the batting in the victory over Netherlands in 1998. In the 1993 Women's Cricket World Cup she made Denmark's highest individual score of 37.

References

Living people
Danish women cricketers
Denmark women One Day International cricketers
Year of birth missing (living people)
Wicket-keepers